Crataegus dahurica is a species of hawthorn native to northeastern Asia. It is closely related to C. sanguinea. The fruit are red or yellow.

See also
 List of Crataegus species with yellow fruit

References

dahurica